is a  reservoir area in the city of Agano, Niigata, Japan.

The reservoir was created in 1639 during the Edo period of Japanese history. It is noted for its abundant and diverse bird life, and is an important overwintering grounds for Whooper swans and Tundra swans. The area received protection from the Japanese government as a wildlife refuge in 2005. 

On October 30, 2008, it was registered as a Ramsar site.

Birds 
 Whooper swan  (October–March)
 Tundra swan 　(October–March)
 Northern pintail  (October–March)
 Common pochard  　(October–March)
 Eastern spot-billed duck  (all seasons)

Plants

Land 
 Nelumbo nucifera  white (July–August)
 Iris  blue-purple (May)

Aquatic 
 Trapa natans var. japonica 
 Phragmites 
 Manchurian wild rice

References

Reservoirs in Japan
Ramsar sites in Japan
Tourist attractions in Niigata Prefecture
Landforms of Niigata Prefecture
Agano, Niigata